Khubdeh (also Romanized as Khūbdeh) is a village in Lafmejan Rural District, in the Central District of Lahijan County, Gilan Province, Iran. At the 2006 census, its population was 198, in 63 families.

References 

Populated places in Lahijan County